Rainbow Moon is a tactical role-playing game developed by SideQuest Studios and published by Eastasiasoft.  It was released through the PlayStation Network for PlayStation 3, PlayStation Vita and PlayStation 4. The game borrows heavily from the dungeon crawling genre while the player traverses the game world, but incorporates elements from tactical role-playing games when enemies are engaged in battle.

A successor titled Rainbow Skies, was released in June 2018 for PS4, PS3 and PS Vita.

Originally a digital-only title, a limited physical run of the PlayStation 4 and PlayStation Vita versions was released on August 19, 2016 through Limited Run Games.

Gameplay

Reception

Upon release, Rainbow Moon received generally positive reviews.  Praise was directed toward the complete feel of the game's mechanics, length of the main storyline and the graphics, while complaints centered on content that reviewers felt forced the player to grind.

References

External links
 

2012 video games
Fantasy video games
PlayStation 3 games
PlayStation 4 games
PlayStation Vita games
PlayStation Network games
Tactical role-playing video games
Video games developed in Germany
Video games scored by Rafael Dyll